Fritz Jules Roethlisberger (October 29, 1898- May 17, 1974) was a social scientist, management theorist at the Harvard Business School.

Biography 
Roethlisberger earned the BA in engineering from Columbia University in 1921, the BS in engineering administration from the Massachusetts Institute of Technology in 1922, and the MA in philosophy from Harvard University in 1925.

Roethlisberger held the following positions at Harvard Business School: Instructor of Industrial Research, 1927–1930; Assistant Professor of Industrial Research, 1930–1938; Associate Professor of Industrial Research, 1938–1946.

In 1937, Roethlisberger and William John Dickson published the first comprehensive findings of the Hawthorne experiments. He also authored Management and the Worker in 1939. The book was voted the tenth most influential management book of the 20th century in a poll of the Fellows of the Academy of Management.

Publications 
Books:
 Roethlisberger, F.J. & Dickson, W.J. (1939) Management and the worker: an account of a research program conducted by the Western electric company, Hawthorne works, Chicago. Harvard University Press, Cambridge, MA.
 Roethlisberger, Fritz Jules (1941) Management and Morale..
 Roethlisberger, F.J. (1968) Man in organization, Belknap Press of Harvard University Press, Cambridge, MA.
 Roethlisberger, F.J. (1977) The elusive phenomena. An autobiographical account of my work in the field of organizational behavior at the Harvard Business School. Harvard Business School Pr, Cambridge, MA.

Articles, a selection:
 Roethlisberger, Fritz J. "The foreman: Master and victim of double talk." Harvard Business Review 23.3 (1945): 283–298.

References

External links

  University of Western Ontario Libraries guide to works by and about Fritz Roethlisberger
 Fritz Jules Roethlisberger papers at Baker Library Special Collections, Harvard Business School

Roethlisberger, Fritz J.
Roethlisberger, Fritz J.
Harvard Business School faculty
MIT Sloan School of Management alumni
American business theorists
Harvard University alumni
Columbia College (New York) alumni